Righteous Kill is a 2008 American action thriller film directed by Jon Avnet and written by Russell Gewirtz. The film stars Robert De Niro and Al Pacino as New York City Police Department detectives on the hunt for a serial killer. It is the third film in which both De Niro and Pacino appear in starring roles (after The Godfather Part II and Heat), and also stars John Leguizamo, Carla Gugino, Donnie Wahlberg, Brian Dennehy, and Curtis Jackson.

Righteous Kill was released in the United States on September 12, 2008. The film received negative reviews from critics and grossed $78.5 million against a $60 million budget.

Plot
Police psychologists review video recordings of a man who goes by the nickname Turk, who states his full name is Detective David Fisk, the Poetry Boy killer. The Poetry Boy earned the moniker for his modus operandi of murdering criminals and leaving short poems with their bodies. Fisk reveals that he looks up to his partner of almost 30 years, Detective Tom Cowan, and considers him to be his role model of how a cop should be. Turk's partner is known by the nickname Rooster, and they are consistently referred to as such outside of the recordings.

The story moves back to Poetry Boy's tenth victim, a pimp named Robert "Rambo" Brady. Turk and Rooster investigate the murder with the less-experienced detectives Karen Corelli, Simon Perez and Ted Riley. When they find a poem on the body, the cops link it to Poetry Boy. Turk is living with Corelli, who happens to be Perez's ex-girlfriend, causing tension across the three detectives.

Poetry Boy next murders acquitted rapist Jonathan Van Luytens and Father Connell, a Catholic priest and child molester (whose victims included Poetry Boy himself). Poetry Boy assaults an intended fourteenth victim, Russian mobster Yevgeny Magulat (who survives), and goes on to shoot at Perez's house and rape Corelli.

Perez and Riley suspect Turk of being Poetry Boy due to his marksmanship skills and psych evaluations, so they arrange a secretly supervised meeting between Turk and suspected drug dealer Marcus "Spider" Smith, during which Turk supposedly will feel the urge to kill Spider. Turk, unaware of the setup, effectively proves his innocence during an encounter with Spider as he has the "wrong" gun and recites a humiliating but obviously inappropriate poem. After Perez and Riley leave the scene unsatisfied, Rooster kills Spider. During this scrape, Rooster inadvertently drops his journal.

Turk stumbles upon and reads Rooster's journal, in which Rooster deems Spider will be Poetry Boy's fourteenth victim. Rooster puts Turk in front of a video camera and forces him to read the journalrevealing how the audience has been misled into thinking Turk is Poetry Boy. Rooster is the actual David Fisk / Poetry Boy, while Turk is actually Tom Cowan. Rooster lost his faith in the justice system when Turk, who he looked up to, planted a gun at the house of an acquitted child molester and murderer, convicting him. This had led Rooster to take the law into his own hands as the vigilante serial killer Poetry Boy.

When Turk finishes, he chases Rooster to a construction site. Rooster fires aimlessly to force Turk to report that the Poetry Boy is assaulting a police officer, resisting arrest, and fleeing, but Turk resists. When Rooster takes aim at Turk, Turk fires, striking Rooster in the chest. Turk calls for an ambulance, but Rooster begs Turk to let him die. After some hesitation, Turk calls off the paramedics, allowing Rooster to succumb to his wounds.

Sometime later, Turk is shown coaching a Police Athletic League baseball team, with Corelli looking on from the bleachers.

Cast

Reception

Box office
Righteous Kill grossed $40.1 million in the United States and Canada, and $38.4 million in other territories, for a worldwide total of $78.5 million.

In its opening weekend, Righteous Kill opened at #3, grossing $16.3 million, behind fellow new releases Burn After Reading and The Family That Preys. Overture Films paid $12 million to acquire the rights to the film, and stated that they would be happy if this film could gross $25 million in the United States theatrically. By comparison, Heat, which starred Pacino and De Niro in 1995, grossed over $180 million worldwide.

Critical response
 

The Times included Righteous Kill on its 100 Worst Films of 2008 list. Keith Phipps of The Onion'''s A.V. Club said, "The novelty of watching De Niro and Pacino team up wears off pretty quickly, [with them] trudging through a thriller that would have felt warmed over in 1988. Director Jon Avnet doesn't offer much compensation for the absent suspense." James Berardinelli of ReelViews gave the film two stars (out of four), saying: "This isn't just generic material; it's generic material with a dumb ending, and the director is a journeyman, not a craftsman. ... Its failure to live up to even modest expectations is a blow. There's nothing righteous to be found here."

Ken Fox of TV Guide also gave Righteous Kill a score of two stars out of four, saying: "The entire movie is one big build-up to a twist that, while not exactly cheating, plays an awfully cheap trick. To get there, writer Russel Gewirtz and director John Avnet sacrifice mystery, suspense, sensible editing and everything else one expects to find in a police thriller just to keep the audience off-guard. It's not worth it, and the first real pairing of De Niro and Pacino is utterly wasted." (The two actors had co-starred in The Godfather Part II without appearing on screen together and in Heat, sharing the screen in just two scenes.)

Claudia Puig of USA Today gave the film one and a half stars out of four, saying: "By the time the movie reaches its protracted conclusion, it feels like a slog. Pacino has a few funny lines, as does Leguizamo, but not nearly enough to save the film from collapsing under the weight of its own self-righteous tedium." Peter Travers of Rolling Stone gave Righteous Kill one star out of four, saying: "Some people think Robert De Niro and Al Pacino would be a kick to watch just reading a phone book. Well, bring on that phone book. Righteous Kill, a.k.a. The Al and Bob Show, is a cop flick with all the drama of Law & Order: AARP." However, Richard Roeper gave the film 3 stars out of 4 and Tim Evans for Sky Movies remarked that the film was "... an effective whodunnit but—more importantly—it poses refined, complex questions about how the law operates in a so-called civilised society."

Al Pacino earned a Razzie Award nomination for Worst Actor for his performance in the film (and for 88 Minutes, also directed by Jon Avnet), but "lost" the award to Mike Myers for The Love Guru''.

Home media
The film was released on DVD and Blu-ray on January 6, 2009. As of February 2009, 778,760 DVD units had been sold, gathering $16.9 million in revenue.

See also
 List of American films of 2008

References

External links
 
 
 

2008 films
2008 independent films
2008 psychological thriller films
2000s American films
2000s buddy cop films
2000s English-language films
2000s serial killer films
American buddy cop films
American buddy drama films
American police detective films
American psychological thriller films
American serial killer films
Films about the New York City Police Department
Films directed by Jon Avnet
Films scored by Edward Shearmur
Films set in New York City
Films shot in Connecticut
Films shot in New York City
MoviePass Films films
Overture Films films
Universal Pictures films